Daniel Ortiz may refer to:

 Danny Ortiz (1976–2004), Guatemalan football goalkeeper
 Danny Ortiz (baseball) (born 1990), Puerto Rican baseball player
 Dan Ortiz (politician), Alaskan state legislator